V339 Delphini or Nova Delphini 2013 (PNV J20233073+2046041) is a bright nova star in the constellation Delphinus. It was discovered on 14 August 2013 by amateur astronomer Koichi Itagaki in Japan and confirmed by the Liverpool Telescope on La Palma. The nova appeared with a magnitude 6.8 when it was discovered and peaked at magnitude 4.3 on 16 August 2013. A nova is produced by the fusion of accumulated material on the white dwarf nova progenitor acquired from its companion star. The nova system is thus a binary star, and a classical nova.   The white dwarf is a carbon-oxygen white dwarf, with an estimated mass of 1.04±0.02 .  There is not yet a consensus about what the binay's orbital period is; estimates range from 3.15 hours to 6.43 hours.

V339 Del is the first nova that has been observed to synthesize the element lithium. Production of lithium-7 from the decay of beryllium-7, which was observed in the wind blown out of the nova. This is the first direct evidence of the supply of lithium to the interstellar medium by an astronomical object. Lithium-7 is fragile in the environment at the center of a nova, so being blown out of the environment at the center is necessary for the observation of lithium. The beryllium was produced by the fusion of helium-3 with helium-4. Nucleosynthesis of lithium is important in the study of chemical abundances in the universe.

See also
 List of novae in the Milky Way galaxy
 Nova Centauri 2013

References

 Central Bureau for Astronomical Telegrams, PNV J20233073+2046041 Transient Object Followup Reports

Further reading

External links

 Sky and Telescope, Bright Nova in Delphinus
 FastSWF, Nova Delphini Evolution 2013-2014 - Animation (hgg) 

Delphini 2013, Nova
PNV J20233073+2046041
Delphini, V339
20130814